The 2009–10 Senior Women's T20 Challenger Trophy was the inaugural season of India's Women's T20 Challenger Trophy. Three teams made up of the best players in India competed in a round-robin group, with the top two advancing to the final. India Green beat India Blue in the final by 24 runs to win the tournament. All matches were held at the Sardar Patel Stadium, Ahmedabad across four days in January 2010. The tournament is the Twenty20 equivalent of the Senior Women's Challenger Trophy, and was not played again until the 2018–19 season.

Competition format
The three teams played in a round-robin group, playing each other team once, with the top two advancing to the final. Matches were played using a Twenty20 format.

The group worked on a points system with positions with the group being based on the total points. Points were awarded as follows:

Win: 4 points. 
Tie: 2 points. 
Loss: 0 points.
No Result/Abandoned: 2 points. 

If points in the final table are equal, teams are separated by most wins, then head-to-head record, and then by Net Run Rate.

Squads

Standings

Source: ESPNCricinfo

Group stage

Final

Statistics

Most runs

Source: ESPN Cricinfo

Most wickets

Source: ESPN Cricinfo

References

2009–10 Indian women's cricket
2009–10
Domestic cricket competitions in 2009–10
Senior Women's T20 Challenger Trophy